Kenneth William Robert Klee (born April 24, 1971) is an American former professional ice hockey defenseman who played most notably with the Washington Capitals in the National Hockey League (NHL).

Early life
Klee was born in Indianapolis, Indiana. The son of a project engineer whose job required frequent moves, he spent portions of his childhood in Indianapolis, Denver, Colorado, and Kansas City, Missouri, before moving to Toronto and the St. Michael's Buzzers on a hockey scholarship as a 17-year-old.

Playing career
Klee was drafted 177th overall by the Washington Capitals in the 1990 NHL Entry Draft. Klee would not play for the Capitals until the 1994–95 season, but it did not take him long to become a regular on the squad. Klee played with the Capitals until the end of the 2002–03 season. Klee had played in Washington for 9 seasons, and played in 604 games (regular season and playoffs) when he then became a free agent and signed with the Toronto Maple Leafs on September 27, 2003.

In Klee's first season in Toronto, he registered career highs in assists (25) and points (29) despite missing 16 games. On March 8, 2006, a day before the NHL's trading deadline, Klee was traded by the struggling Maple Leafs to the New Jersey Devils in exchange for winger Alexander Suglobov.  On July 24, 2006, Klee signed a one-year contract with the Colorado Avalanche as a free agent for the 2006–07 season. Klee finished the season leading the Avalanche with a plus/minus of 18. On July 2, 2007, Klee signed a two-year contract with the Atlanta Thrashers.

On September 26, 2008, into the final year of his contract with the Thrashers, Klee was dealt along with Brad Larsen and Chad Painchaud to the Anaheim Ducks for defenseman Mathieu Schneider. After starting the 2008–09 season with the Ducks, Klee was claimed off re-entry waivers by the Phoenix Coyotes on October 28, 2008. After playing out the season with the Coyotes and becoming a free agent, Klee unofficially announced his retirement.

Though not known as a goal scorer, 13 of his 55 career goals were game-winning goals, the highest percentage in NHL history.

International play
Klee represent United States at the 1991 World Junior Ice Hockey Championships and senior level at the 1992 Men's World Ice Hockey Championships, 1997 Men's World Ice Hockey Championships and also at the 2004 World Cup of Hockey.

Coaching career
Klee was the head coach for the U.S. squad that finished second during his first Four Nations Cup in 2014 (2-0-1-1). That season, he also guided the U.S. Women's Under-22 Select Team to a first-place finish during his first campaign behind the bench for the U.S. in the 2014 Under-22 Series, defeating Canada in all three games. Klee led the U.S. Women's National Team to the gold medal at the 2015 IIHF Women's World Championship in Malmo, Sweden. He also guided the U.S. to a first-place finish at the 2015 Under-22 Series, defeating Canada two games to one.

Serving in the same capacity at the 2015 Four Nations Cup in Sundsvall, Sweden, Klee led the U.S. to an undefeated record (3-1-0-0) and first championship title since 2012. The tournament marks the seventh consecutive event that Klee has been at the helm of Team USA and the third time he has been behind the bench at the Four Nations Cup. He now owns an 18-3-1-2 record overall.

Klee was the head coach of the U.S. Women's National Team for the 2016 Four Nations Cup in Vierumaki, Finland from Oct. 29 – Nov. 6. Klee then served as head coach of the U.S. Women's National Team at the 2016 International Ice Hockey Federation Women's World Championship in Kamloops, British Columbia. He led the U.S. to an undefeated record (4-1-0-0, W-OTW-OTL-L) and gold-medal.

Having left the women's national team, on July 18, 2017, Klee was hired as an assistant coach with the Syracuse Crunch of the American Hockey League.

Career statistics

Regular season and playoffs

International

Transactions
 Selected by Washington Capitals in 1990 NHL Entry Draft. He was Washington's 9th round choice, 177th overall.
 Signed as a free agent by Toronto on September 27, 2003.
 Traded to New Jersey Devils by Toronto for Aleksander Suglobov on March 8, 2006.
 Signed as a free agent by Colorado Avalanche on July 24, 2006.
 Signed as a free agent by Atlanta Thrashers on July 2, 2007.
 Traded to Anaheim Ducks along with Brad Larsen and Chad Painchaud for Mathieu Schneider on September 26, 2008.
 Claimed off re-entry waivers by the Phoenix Coyotes on October 28, 2008.

References

External links

1971 births
Living people
American men's ice hockey defensemen
Anaheim Ducks players
Atlanta Thrashers players
Baltimore Skipjacks players
Bowling Green Falcons men's ice hockey players
Bowling Green State University alumni
Colorado Avalanche players
Ice hockey players from Indiana
Ice hockey people from Missouri
New Jersey Devils players
Phoenix Coyotes players
Portland Pirates players
Sportspeople from Indianapolis
Sportspeople from Kansas City, Missouri
Toronto Maple Leafs players
Washington Capitals draft picks
Washington Capitals players
Ice hockey coaches from Indiana